Godern is a village and a former municipality in the Ludwigslust-Parchim district, in Mecklenburg-Vorpommern, Germany. Since 1 January 2012, it is part of the municipality Pinnow.

References

Former municipalities in Mecklenburg-Western Pomerania